The 2010 congressional elections in Hawaii was held on November 2, 2010, to determine who was to represent the state of Hawaii in the United States House of Representatives for the 112th Congress from January 2011, until their terms of office expire in January 2013.

Hawaii has two seats in the House, apportioned according to the 2000 United States census. Representatives are elected for two-year terms. The election coincided with the 2010 gubernatorial election.

Overview

By district
Results of the 2010 United States House of Representatives elections in Hawaii by district:

District 1

Campaign
Republican Congressman Charles Djou was first elected in a special election in May 2010, which Republicans heralded as a "significant win" and to which DNC Chairman Tim Kaine responded, "Democrats got 60% of the vote in that race. In the November election, it will be one Democrat against one Republican, and we feel very, very confident about winning that race." In the general election, Hawaii State Senate President Colleen Hanabusa, also a candidate in the special election, emerged as the Democratic nominee. Though former Congressman Ed Case, the other Democratic candidate in the special election, was speculated to run again in November, he ultimately decided against it. In the general election, both parties heavily invested in taking the seat, and polls indicated that the race was close up until election day. On election day, however, Hanabusa edged out Djou by a surprising large six point margin of victory and was sent to Congress for her first term.

Results

Polling

†Internal poll (Tarrance Group for Djou and Global Strategy Group for Hanabusa)

District 2

Campaign
This liberal district that encompasses all of Hawaii but Honolulu, has been represented by Democratic Congresswoman Mazie Hirono since she was first elected in 2006. This year, Congresswoman Hirono faced Republican challenger and Tea Party activist John Willoughby in the general election. Though Willoughby attacked Hirono for refusing to debate, polls indicated that the Congresswoman was a shoo-in for re-election.

Results

References

External links
Hawaii Office of Elections
U.S. Congress candidates for Hawaii at Project Vote Smart
Hawaii U.S. House from OurCampaigns.com
Campaign contributions for U.S. Congressional races in Hawaii from OpenSecrets
2010 Hawaii General Election graph of multiple polls from Pollster.com
House – Hawaii from the Cook Political Report

Hawaii
United States House of Representatives
2010